The Contender 1 is the first season of The Contender.

Contestants
The West Coast wear gold, and the East Coast blue. Much of the equipment is being provided by Everlast.

Tournament Tracker
While The Contender is a reality TV show, it does contain a serious competition with a proper format – a 16-man knockout tournament.

Preliminary round
1. Alfonso (W) beat Peter (E) on points. (Peter re-entered the competition after Jeff was removed due to illness.)
2. Jesse (W) beat Jonathan (E) on points.
3. Ishe (W) beat Ahmed (E) on points. (Ahmed re-entered the competition after Juan left due to injury.)
4. Sergio (W) beat Najai (E) on points
5. Peter (E) beat Miguel (W) on points.
6. Anthony (W) beat Brent (E) by knockout. (Brent was declared unfit to continue.)
7. Juan (E) beat Tarick (W) on points.(Juan was injured making him unable to continue in the tournament.)
8. Joey (W) beat Jimmy (E) on points.
(Numbers refer to the episode in which the fight took place.)

Quarter finals
Quarterfinal bouts are determined by the individual winner of each challenge. The winner can choose whom he wants to fight, or become the "matchmaker" and select two fighters to compete against each other.
9. Sergio beat Ishe on points.
10. Alfonso beat Ahmed on points.
11. Peter beat Joey on points. (Fight stopped in 5th due to accidental headbutt.)
12. Jesse beat Anthony by knock-out. (Although Anthony was still conscious.)
(Numbers refer to the episode in which the fight took place.)

Semi finals
These two matches took place between the four remaining boxers, Sergio, Alfonso, Peter, Jesse.
13. Peter beat Alfonso on points.
14. Sergio beat Jesse on points.
(Numbers refer to the episode in which the fight took place.)
On the final night in Las Vegas, Alfonso Gomez took on Jesse Brinkley for 200,000 prize.
Alfonso was in better shape and connected better punches.

The Finale
For $1,000,000, from Caesars Palace, Las Vegas.
15. Sergio beat Peter on points.
(For third place, Alfonso beat Jesse on points.)
(Number refers to the episode in which the fight took place.)

Fans Favorite Fights
These three bouts were staged as warm-up events for the final.
Jimmy beat Tarick on points.
Ishe beat Anthony.
Jeff beat Brent.

Guest appearances
Cedric Ceballos
Tony Danza
Angelo Dundee
Matt Stone and Trey Parker
George Foreman
Mel Gibson
Ja Rule
Dr. Drew
Jay Leno
Chuck Norris
Burt Reynolds
William Shatner
Meg Ryan and Omar Epps to promote Against the Ropes
Bill Goldberg
Lewis White
Tom Bei
Mr. Met
Mr. T
Danny Green
Vic Darchinyan
Jason Sehorn
Micky Ward

Weekly results

 Navy means the boxer won the team challenge and the match.
 Cornflower blue means the boxer lost the team challenge and won the match.
 Light blue means the boxer won the match.
 Cyan means the team won the challenge.
 Tomato means the boxer lost the match.
 Red means the boxer won the team challenge and lost the match.
 Dark red means the boxer lost the team challenge and the match.
 Gray means the boxer quit the competition.

The Contender (TV series)
2005 American television seasons
2000s American reality television series
2005 American television series debuts
2005 American television series endings